Fermo "Mino" Martinazzoli (3 November 1931 – 4 September 2011) was an Italian lawyer, politician and former minister. He was the last secretary of the Christian Democracy party and the first secretary of the Italian People's Party founded in 1994.

Biography
Martinazzoli studied at Collegio Borromeo in Pavia, where he received a law degree. He then became a lawyer.

In the years 1960–1970s he assumed official roles in  Brescia's DC, and became president of the province (1970–1972). He was also elected in the Italian Senate, after which he became Minister of Justice in 1983, a position he held for three years. In 1986–1989 he was president of DC's deputies. In 1989–1990 he was Minister of Defence, but resigned (together with other ministers of DC's left wing) after the approval of a law which strengthened Silvio Berlusconi's monopoly over private TV channels in Italy.

In 1992, when Democrazia Cristiana was being wiped out by the Tangentopoli bribery scandal, Martinazzoli, generally respected as an honest and competent man, was elected national secretary. Despite his efforts, the political crisis which followed the corruption scandals forced him to dissolve DC in 1994. Martinazzoli then founded a new party, based on similar ideals, known as the Italian People's Party (1994–2002) (Partito Popolare Italiano; PPI), whose name recalled that of the ancestor of DC, which was founded in the early 20th century by Luigi Sturzo.

In the new majoritarian system, Martinazzoli's party placed itself in the center, between the left (which included the heirs of the Italian Communist Party) and the new Silvio Berlusconi's Forza Italia, which had allied with the northern regionalist party, Northern League, and the post-fascist National Alliance. His will not to ally with any of them caused numerous politicians (such as Pierferdinando Casini and Clemente Mastella) to leave PPI and form the Christian Democratic Centre, which supported Berlusconi. At the 1994 elections, Martinazzoli formed a center alliance known as Pact for Italy, including PPI and other democratic centre forces. However, the result of the election was disappointing, with PPI obtaining 11%, some one third of DC's consensus before its dissolution. In the same year, he accepted to run as mayor of Brescia for the new centre-left coalition, The Olive Tree, winning the final ballot and acting as mayor until 1998. In 2000 he lost the competition with Roberto Formigoni for the presidency of Lombardy.

After PPI was dissolved in 2002, Martinazzoli migrated to Mastella's UDEUR (2004), being appointed as its president. He resigned in 2005.

He died on 4 September 2011, at the age of 79.

Electoral history

Notes

Sources

 

 

1931 births
2011 deaths
Italian Ministers of Defence
Italian Ministers of Justice
Presidents of the Province of Brescia
20th-century Italian lawyers
Christian Democracy (Italy) politicians
Italian People's Party (1994) politicians
Mayors of Brescia